The Army Mules are a group of mules which serve as the mascots for the United States Military Academy in West Point, New York.

The tradition of mules as mascots for Army dates back to 1899, when an officer at the Philadelphia Quartermaster Depot decided that the team needed a mascot to counter the Navy goat. Mules were an obvious choice, as they were used as haulers for Army gear for generations. Not much is known about the "official" mules until 1936, when Mr. Jackson (named for Thomas J. "Stonewall" Jackson), a former Army pack mule, arrived from Front Royal, Virginia. He served for twelve years, presiding over two national championship teams. Starting with Mr. Jackson, there have been seventeen "official" Army mules, only one, Buckshot, being female. The current Mule Corps are:

Ranger III (formerly known as Jack): Ranger III, one of the Army Mules, has been on campus since 2011. He was trained by MAJ Anne Hessinger, an Army veterinarian who served at West Point in 2003–2006. Named, like his predecessor, for the 75th Ranger Regiment and all Rangers past and present, Ranger III came to the academy in 2011 as a gift of Steve Townes, class of 1975.
Stryker (formerly known as Abe): Stryker is the half-brother of Ranger III. He was also trained by MAJ Anne Hessinger and gifted by Steve Townes. Stryker stands at a height slightly shorter than his brother.
Paladin (formerly known as Apache and Rocky): The newest member of the group, joined in February 2016, and is also a gift of Steve Townes. Paladin stands about two hands shorter than the half-brothers, and is half thoroughbred rather than Percheron.

The Army Mules are trained by cadet Mule Riders, a part of the Spirit Support Activity of the U.S. Corps of Cadets. The current Army Mule Riders are: Cadet Garrett Dolan, 2021, Cadet Sarah Traynor, 2022, Cadet Kyle Kass, 2023, and Cadet Benjamin Bennett, 2024. Together they are present at many of West Point's athletic events, parades, and other ceremonial activities.

The Mules serve not only as West Point's mascot, but also as the mascot for the entire United States Army.

References
Army Mules – GoArmySports.com

Patriot League mascots
United States Military Academy